List of UK children's book publishers.

For UK children's authors, see Children's non-fiction authors.

A
 Albury Books
 Allen Lane
 Andersen Press
 Austin Macauley Publishers

B
 Barefoot Books - Canadian not British
 Barrington Stoke
 Blackie and Son Limited - ceased operation 1991
 Bloomsbury Publishing
 The Bodley Head
 Buster Books
 BookLife Publishing

C
 Cicada Books
 Chicken House

D
 Dorling Kindersley

E
 Egmont Publishing
 Evans Brothers

F
 Faber and Faber
 Farshore
 Frances Lincoln Children's Books

G
 Girls Gone By Publishers

H
 Hamish Hamilton
 HarperCollins
 Heinemann
 Hodder & Stoughton
 Hogs Back Books

J
 Jonathan Cape
 The Juvenile Library, established 1805 by Mary Jane Clairmont and William Godwin

L
 Ladybird Books
 Lion Hudson

M
 Macmillan Publishers
 Michael O'Mara Books
 Miles Kelly Publishing

N
 Nosy Crow

O
 Orchard Books (imprint of Hachette UK)
 Orion Publishing Group
 Our Street Books (imprint of John Hunt Publishing)
 Oxford University Press

P
 Parragon
 Puffin Books (division of Penguin Books)
 Peahen Publishing

Q
 The Quarto Group

R
 Random House

S
 Salariya Book Company
 Simon & Schuster
 SRL Publishing

T
 Top That Publishing Ltd
 Templar Publishing (an imprint of Bonnier Group)

U
 Usborne Publishing

V

W
 Walker Books Ltd
 Wells Gardner, Darton and Company — ceased operations  1985

X

Y

Z

See also
 List of largest UK book publishers
 Books in the United Kingdom
 Book trade in the United Kingdom

References

Uk Children
British literature-related lists